The borotellurates are heteropoly anion compounds which have tellurate groups attached to boron atoms. The ratio of tellurate to borate reflects the degree of condensation. In [TeO4(BO3)2]8- the anions are linked into a chain. In [TeO2(BO3)4]10− the structure is zero dimensional with isolated anions. These arrangements of oxygen around boron and tellurium can have forms resembling silicates. The first borotellurates to be discovered were the mixed sodium rare earth compounds in 2015.

The tellurate is of the form TeO6 in an octahedral arrangement. The borate is in the form BO3, with two oxygen atoms shared with two tellurate TeO6 groups.

Related compounds include boroantimonates, galloborates, borogermanates, borophosphates, boroselenates, boroselenites, and borosulfates.

Formation 
Borotellurates are formed by heating boric acid, and tellurium dioxide, with metal carbonates or oxides at over 800 °C. Lower temperatures can be used with a flux like potassium carbonate.

Reactions 
When heated to around 800 °C the borotellurates decompose by emitting TeO3 vapour and form a metal borate or metal tellurite.

List

References

Borates
Tellurates